, sometimes called Sukeban Boy, is a Japanese manga written and illustrated by Go Nagai, serialized in Shogakukan's Weekly Shōnen Sunday from 1974 to 1976. It is a comedy with several erotic touches, where the protagonist Banji Suke (or Sukeban) has to disguise himself as a girl in order to be able to attend an all-female school to try and clear his name after being left the blame for the chaos all over town, while unaware that his assassins are watching his every move. As Suke Ban is a rebellious boy, this situation creates several comedic troubles.

The manga was adapted to an OVA in 1992, and was released by ADV Films in the US under the name Delinquent in Drag.

It has also spawned two live-action movies, Oira Sukeban: Kessen! Pansutō (おいら女蛮 決戦!パンス党) in 1992 starring actor Shinji Takeda, and Oira Sukeban (called mostly Sukeban Boy) in 2006 starring AV idol Asami (亜紗美).

Staff of Oira Sukeban: Kessen! Pansutō (1992)
Studio: Taki Corporation
Director: Teruyoshi Ishii
Original work: Go Nagai
Writer: Masaki Tsuji
Music: Yoshihiro Kunimoto
Producer: Tsuburaya Eizō
Song lyrics: Go Nagai
Cast: Shinji Takeda, Kazuyo Harada, Keiko Hirota, Keiko Hata, Yoshikatsu Fujimoto, Shingo Kazami, Go Nagai, Daijirō Harada, Kuma Leonard, Rie Asai, Yuka Watanabe

Staff of Oira Sukeban (Sukeban Boy) (2006)
Studio: King Records
Director: Noboru Iguchi
Producer: Yukihiko Yamaguchi, Masaki Takemura, Hiroyuki Yamada
Original work: Go Nagai
Writer: Noboru Iguchi
Cinematography: Yasutaka Nagano
Special makeup: Yoshihiro Nishimura
Art: Shinpei Inoe
Music: Masako Ishii
Illumination: Reiji Ōkubo
Cast: Asami, Emiru Momose, Saori Matsunaka, Shizuka Itō, Demo Tanaka, Chisa Imai, Shō Sawamura, Kaori, Miwa, Kentarō Kishi, Hiroaki Murakami, Beat Arima, Atsuko Miura, Kōichi Ōbori

References

External links
Oira Sukeban 2006 Review on DeVilDead 
Oira Sukeban  at The World of Go Nagai webpage
Oira Sukeban: Kessen! Pansuto  at allcinema
Oira Sukeban: Kessen! Pansuto  at the Japanese Movie Database

Oira sukeban (OVA)  at allcinema

Oira Sukeban (2006)  at allcinema
Oira Sukeban (2006)  at Variety Japan

1974 manga
1992 anime OVAs
1992 films
2006 films
ADV Films
Comedy anime and manga
Cross-dressing in anime and manga
Animated films based on manga
Films directed by Noboru Iguchi
2000s Japanese-language films
School life in anime and manga
Shogakukan manga
Shōnen manga
Live-action films based on manga
Single OVAs
Discotek Media
Juvenile delinquency in fiction